The Secret Lives of Waldo Kitty (later called The New Adventures of Waldo Kitty) is an American animated and partially live-action television series, produced by Filmation, which originally aired for one season Saturday mornings on the National Broadcasting Company (NBC) from September 6 to November 29, 1975. Howard Morris, Jane Webb, and Allan Melvin provided voices for the three main characters on the series. The show follows a cat named Waldo who daydreams of being a superhero and defeating the villainous bulldog Tyrone. It was inspired by James Thurber's 1939 short story "The Secret Life of Walter Mitty", and his wife Helen Thurber sued Filmation in 1975 for creating the series without the permission of her late husband's estate. The outcome of the decision resulted in the series being retitled in future broadcasts as The New Adventures of Waldo Kitty.

The Secret Lives of Waldo Kitty was produced by Lou Scheimer and Norm Prescott and directed by Don Christensen and Rudy Larriva. Critically, positive response was aimed at the show's imaginative story lines and its ability to parody pop culture events well. However, producer Scheimer was extremely upset by the series' final result, listing the issues that arose during production and the minimal number of episodes produced as reasons why among others. The series has a total of just 13 episodes. In 1989, three episodes from The Secret Lives of Waldo Kitty were featured on a VHS tape released by United American Video.

Premise and description 
The series was inspired by Walter Mitty, the main character in James Thurber's 1939 short story "The Secret Life of Walter Mitty". Each episode began with live action footage of Waldo and Felicia, who were usually being bullied by Tyrone. Waldo would then daydream about being a superhero and coming to the rescue of others. The series contained a lot of satire per the request of Filmation and cited television series Rowan & Martin's Laugh-In and magazine Mad as the reason why.

Characters 
The series features the following three main characters throughout its run:
 Howard Morris as Waldo, a "fraidy cat" who enjoys imagining and dreaming that he is a superhero; he pictures himself in a variety of personas, including Catman, Robin Cat, The Lone Kitty, and Catzan.
 Jane Webb as Felicia, a cat who is Waldo's girlfriend and trusty companion. During the animation portions of the show, she is usually held captive or kidnapped by Tyrone and eventually rescued by Waldo.
 Allan Melvin as Tyrone, an evil English bulldog. He generally bullies Waldo and Felicia in each episode, during both the animated and live action segments. Scheimer selected Melvin to voice Tyrone as he had "a hoarse [and] very deep voice".

Production and filming 
The concept for The Secret Lives of Waldo Kitty was first developed by Lorna Smith, who was in charge of the layout of several Filmation series at the time. Being a "big cat lover", she suggested to Scheimer that they create a series led by cats; however, according to Scheimer, he didn't remember their conversation but because "she raised a fuss" regarding the issue, Smith ultimately received credit for the idea in the show's credits. Scheimer claimed in a 2012 autobiography, co-written by Andy Mangels, that the production of the series was also extremely problematic. In 1974, NBC reduced the episode orders on its green-lit series from sixteen to thirteen episodes, which Scheimer felt made it very difficult to sell the show to different markets around the world. He said that with just thirteen episodes, "you were always taking a chance that you were producing something that was going to have no value except on commercial television in the United States".

Executively produced by Lou Scheimer and Norm Prescott's Filmation, Don Christensen and Rudy Larriva served as the series' two directors. Additionally, Jim Ryan and Bill Danch contributed as head writers to the series, while Ray Ellis (under the alias name Yvette Blais) and Jeff Michael composed the opening theme music for the show. Since the series' title and story were a play on Thurber's short story without the permission of his estate, his wife Helen Thurber filed a lawsuit against Filmation in 1975. She cited that the company "debas[ed] and distort[ed]" her late husband's story. Due to the controversy, Filmation ultimately settled with Thurber and changed the title to The New Adventures of Waldo Kitty in syndication.

In the early 1970s, Filmation began producing several new series for the Big Three television networks. They started creating live action series, instead of just animation ones, and also series that combined both. While a majority of the series was animated, live-action segments involving actual animals were also included to separate different scenes in an episode. According to Scheimer, filming with the animals was tough, as the bulldog who portrayed Tyrone would often chase the cats on set around and not stay still during filming.

Episodes

Reception

Broadcast history 
The Secret Lives of Waldo Kitty was broadcast on NBC as part of their Saturday morning children's lineup between September 6 and November 29, 1975, and before being cancelled, it continued to air regularly on the network until September 4, 1976. In March 1976, Filmation received news from NBC that they had decided not to renew the series for a second season and instead chose to focus on "spread[ing] their schedule between reruns of vintage toons and new live-action shows". At its original allocated time slot, the series aired immediately after syndicated repeats of Josie and the Pussycats (1970–1971) and right before new episodes of The Pink Panther Show (1969–1980).

In August 1989, United American Video released several Filmation series on VHS in the United States. As part of their limited line of "budget" VHS tapes, they released The Secret Lives of Waldo Kitty, Groovie Goolies (1970), Fat Albert and the Cosby Kids (1972–1985), My Favorite Martians (1973), Space Sentinels (1977), and Blackstar (1981) for the first time ever. The tape featuring The Secret Lives of Waldo Kitty contained just three of the thirteen episodes.

Critical reception 
Many years later, authors Timothy Burke and Kevin Burke wrote in Saturday Morning Fever: Growing Up with Cartoon Culture called the show a "special treat" and appreciated it for being able to parody "pop culture stables" cleverly. They enjoyed that Waldo was selected as the main character because there was "no more perfect a character for kids to empathize with than a shy dreamer who lives out a thousand adventures in his or her head". They also speculated that Wishbone (1995–1997) contained the same premise as The Secret Lives of Waldo Kitty, but with a dog as the main character instead of a cat. Producer Scheimer was hugely disappointed by the entire series, calling it "a mistake on many levels".

References

Citations

Bibliography

External links 

 

1970s American animated television series
1975 American television series debuts
1975 American television series endings
American children's animated comedy television series
American television series with live action and animation
Animated television series about cats
NBC original programming
Television series by Filmation
Television series by Universal Television